NEF College, Guwahati, India is a private college affiliated to Assam Higher Secondary Education Council , Dibrugarh University and Gauhati University. The College admits
Bachelor of Arts , Master of Arts ,  Bachelor of Commerce , Master of Commerce which are affiliated to Gauhati University and Bachelor of Business Administration , Master of Business Administration, Bachelor of Social Work, Master of Social Work which are affiliated to Dibrugarh University . The College is located at Lokhra Lalganesh Road, Saukuchi, Guwahati-40.

Academic departments
The College offers following full-time regular courses as per as regulation of AHSEC, Gauhati University, Dibrugarh University :-
 Higher Secondary (AHSEC)
 Bachelor of Arts (Gauhati University)
 Bachelor of Commerce (Gauhati University)
 Master of Commerce (Gauhati University)
 Master of Arts in Sociology (Gauhati University)
 Bachelor of Business Administration (Dibrugarh University)
 Bachelor of Social Work (Dibrugarh University)
 Masters of Business Administration (Dibrugarh University)
 Masters of Social Work (Dibrugarh University)

Facilities
 Two laboratories
 Library with around 4000 books

Ranking and reputation
Its Department of Social Work has been ranked 34 in all over India by India Todays "India's Best MSW Colleges 2019".

See also
 NEF Law College
 Dibrugarh University

References

External links
   Dibrugarh University affiliated College webpage

Universities and colleges in Assam
Schools in Guwahati
2018 establishments in Assam
Educational institutions established in 2018